Girolamo Centelles was a Roman Catholic prelate who was Archbishop of Reggio Calabria (1529–1535).

Biography
On 16 July 1529, during the papacy of Pope Clement VII, Girolamo Centelles was appointed Archbishop of Reggio Calabria.
On 17 August 1529, he was consecrated bishop by Gabriele Mascioli Foschi, Archbishop of Durrës.
He was Archbishop of Reggio Calabria until his resignation in 1535.

References

External links and additional sources
 (for Chronology of Bishops) 
 (for Chronology of Bishops) 

16th-century Roman Catholic archbishops in the Kingdom of Naples
Bishops appointed by Pope Clement VII